The Auld-McCobb House is a historic double house on Oak Street in Boothbay Harbor, Maine.  It is the town's oldest brick residence, built in 1807 for a pair of prominent local merchants.  It was listed on the National Register of Historic Places in 1988.

Description and history
The Auld-McCobb House is set on a rise overlooking downtown Boothbay Harbor, near the center of a triangular block formed by Oak Street, McClintock Street, and Townsend Avenue.  It is a large double-pile two story brick structure, with a hip roof and a rubblestone foundation.  Its front facade faces roughly west, and is six bays wide.  The bays are symmetrically arranged, with two entrances in the center bays, with simple surrounds.  Ground-floor windows are twelve-over-twelve sash, and second-floor windows are twelve-over-eight sash, all set in rectangular openings with similar simple trim.

The house was built in 1807 for Jacob Auld and Joseph McCobb, two prominent local merchants.  The two were engaged in a business partnership that included fishing, shipbuilding, and general mercantile pursuits, and were a dominant force in the local economy in the first quarter of the 19th century.  McCobb married Auld's sister in 1807, and it is thought that this is what occasioned the house's construction.  The builder is traditionally identified as John Leishman, Jr., although there is no significant documentation to substantiate this.  The house is out of scale for other surviving construction of the period in the town, and the use of brick was also quite unusual.

See also
National Register of Historic Places listings in Lincoln County, Maine

References

Houses on the National Register of Historic Places in Maine
Federal architecture in Maine
Houses completed in 1807
Houses in Lincoln County, Maine
National Register of Historic Places in Lincoln County, Maine
Boothbay Harbor, Maine